The Bangladesh Hajj Office is a Bangladesh government regulatory agency under the Ministry of Religious Affairs that is responsible for Hajj management in Bangladesh.

History
Bangladesh Hajj is responsible for the regulation of the hajj in Bangladesh. It also has an office in Mecca. It is responsible for the management of Ashkona Hajj Camp, where pilgrims wait for their flight to Saudi Arabia.

Jeddah 
Banglasesh Hajj office has a local office in Jeddah, Saudi Arabia. It is led by counselor Md. Jahirul Islam. The office is responsible for providing support and aid to Bangladeshi pilgrims in Saudi Arabia.

References

Organisations based in Dhaka
Government departments of Bangladesh
Government agencies of Bangladesh